William Abbot or Abbott (12 June 1790 – 1 June 1843) was an English actor, and a theatrical manager, both in England and the United States.

Life
Abbot was born in Chelsea just outside London, and made his first appearance on the stage at Bath in 1806, and his first London appearance in 1808, at the Haymarket Theatre, in a benefit performance. There he appeared as Frederick in an 1809 production of Lovers' Vows.  At the Covent Garden Theatre in 1813, in light comedy and melodrama, he made his first definite success. He was Pylades to William Charles Macready's Orestes in Ambrose Philips's Distressed Mother when Macready made his first appearance there, in 1816.  He created the parts of Appius Claudius in Sheridan Knowles's Virginius (1820) and of Modus in his The Hunchback (1832).

In 1827 Abbot organized the company, including Harriet Smithson, which acted Shakespeare in Paris. His position was as stage manager; he performed at the Salle Favart, but not to plaudits.  On his return to London he played Romeo to Fanny Kemble's Juliet (1830).  Two of Abbot's melodramas, The Youthful Days of Frederick the Great (1817) and Swedish Patriotism (1819), were produced at Covent Garden.

Abbot also worked in America, where he first appeared as "Mr. Beverly" in an 1832 production of The Gamester at the Park Theatre in New York. Later he moved to Charleston, South Carolina, where he created the New Charleston Theatre and operated it from 1837 through 1841. This theatre brought stars like Ellen Tree to the company there, but did not enjoy major success.

William Abbot died in New York on 7 June 1843; also earlier that year in Baltimore, Maryland. He had married an actress, Elizabeth Bradshaw née Buloid.

Selected roles
 Prince Royal in The Youthful Days of Frederick the Great by William Abbot (1817)
 Young Bowerscort in A Word to the Ladies by James Kenney (1818)
 Hafiz in Retribution by John Dillon (1818)
 King of Naples in Evadne by Richard Sheil (1819)
 Captain Albert in Swedish Patriotism  by William Abbot (1819)
 Appius Claudius in Virginius by James Sheridan Knowles (1820)
 Dionysius in Damon and Pythias by John Banim and Richard Sheil (1821)
 Count D'Alba in Julian by Mary Russell Mitford (1823)
 Modus in The Hunchback by James Sheridan Knowles (1832)
 Clement Marot in Francis the First by Fanny Kemble (1832)
 Lorenzo in The Wife by James Sheridan Knowles (1833)
 Charles I in Charles the First by Mary Russell Mitford (1834)

References 

Who Was Who in America, Historical Volume 1607–1896.  Chicago: Marquis Who's Who, 1963.

Attribution

1790 births
1843 deaths
19th-century English businesspeople
Businesspeople from London
British emigrants to the United States
English male stage actors
19th-century English male actors
English theatre managers and producers
19th-century theatre managers
People from Chelsea, London